Kudzai is a given name. Notable persons with this name include:
Kudzai Maunze (born 1991), Zimbabwean cricketer
Kudzai Sauramba (born 1992), Zimbabwean cricketer
Kudzai Taibu (born 1984), Zimbabwean cricketer
Kudzai Vilika (born 1983), Zimbabwean Media and Marketing Director, and Pastor in ZAOGA FIFMI